Dominic Wightman is a Conservative Party activist, working in the United Kingdom.
Until 2006 he was the director and spokesman for the VIGIL network, a privately financed counter-terrorism think-tank. He is currently the Editor of the Westminster Journal.[5].

Wightman has prepared documents for leading UK politicians.[3].

Wightman and another VIGIL member appeared on the BBC in November 2006, where he spoke about a group named Hizb ut-Tahrir Britain.

References

1972 births
Living people
British writers